Philautus maosonensis is a species of frog in the family Rhacophoridae.
It is found in Vietnam and possibly China.
Its natural habitats are subtropical or tropical moist lowland forests and subtropical or tropical moist montane forests.
It is threatened by habitat loss.

References

maosonensis
Amphibians described in 1937
Taxonomy articles created by Polbot